Richard Gynge (born 1 February 1987 in Tyresö) is a Swedish professional ice hockey player, currently playing for AIK of the HockeyAllsvenskan (Allsv). Former clubs he has represented include Brynäs IF and Växjö Lakers of the SHL, and HC Dynamo Moscow, HC Lev Praha, Admiral Vladivostok, HC Neftekhimik Nizhnekamsk and Traktor Chelyabinsk of the Kontinental Hockey League (KHL).

After two seasons with Traktor Chelyabinsk, Gynge opted to return to his native Sweden as a free agent, signing for a second stint with the Växjö Lakers in agreeing to a three-year contract on 23 July 2019.

Career statistics

Awards and honours

References

External links

1987 births
Living people
Admiral Vladivostok players
AIK IF players
Brynäs IF players
HC Dynamo Moscow players
IK Oskarshamn players
HC Lev Praha players
HC Neftekhimik Nizhnekamsk players
People from Tyresö Municipality
Swedish ice hockey centres
Traktor Chelyabinsk players
Växjö Lakers players
VIK Västerås HK players
Sportspeople from Stockholm County
Swedish expatriate sportspeople in the Czech Republic
Swedish expatriate sportspeople in Russia
Expatriate ice hockey players in Sweden
Expatriate ice hockey players in the Czech Republic
Swedish expatriate ice hockey people